Offset Press Inc., Also known as OPI, is an Iranian corporation that develops, manufactures, and distributes analogue and digital products and systems for the making, processing, and reproduction of images.

While the demographic of the corporation has changed with time, OPI initially started developing text books.

The company operates publicly in Iran, being listed on the Tehran Stock Exchange since 1990.

History
Offset Press was established in 1957 with funding from governmental corporations. In 1962 one of the shareholders of the company sold 600 shares of the company to Department of Social Services, which remain Offset's principal shareholder. However, with changing to business laws in Iran, OPI became a Private Corporation in the early 1970s, then reverted to being a public corporation.

Company Structure
Offset Press currently operates at 4 branches throughout Iran; At present, the corporation prints 75 million copies of school books with an average of 160 pages each, 165 million copies of 16 pages full colour newspapers, 35 million copies of magazines with an average of 36 pages each, and 2 million copies of other print media

References
 

Printing companies
Photography companies of Iran
Companies listed on the Tehran Stock Exchange
Book publishing companies of Iran
Manufacturing companies based in Tehran